Air France Flight 007 crashed on 3 June 1962 while on take-off from Orly Airport. The only survivors of the disaster were two flight attendants; the other eight crew members, and all 122 passengers on board the Boeing 707, were killed. The crash was at the time the worst single-aircraft disaster and the first single civilian jet airliner disaster with more than 100 deaths.

Accident 

According to witnesses, during the takeoff roll on runway 8, the nose of Flight 007 lifted off the runway, but the main landing gear remained on the ground. Though the aircraft had already exceeded the maximum speed at which the takeoff could be safely aborted within the remaining runway length, the flight crew had no other choice and attempted to abort the take off.

They braked so hard, they destroyed the main landing gear tires and wheels, but the aircraft ran off the end of the runway. They plowed into the town of Villeneuve-le-Roi. The left undercarriage failed and a fire broke out from the fuselage. Three flight attendants initially survived the disaster. Two attendants survived, but the third died in the hospital. At the time, it was the world's worst air disaster involving one aircraft. This death toll would be surpassed over 3.5 years later, when in February 1966, All Nippon Airways Flight 60 crashed into Tokyo Bay for reasons unknown, killing all 133 people.

Later investigation found indications that a motor driving the elevator trim may have failed, leaving pilot Captain Roland Hoche and First Officer Jacques Pitoiset unable to complete rotation and liftoff.

Impact on Atlanta, Georgia 
The Atlanta Art Association had sponsored a month-long tour of the art treasures of Europe, and 106 of the passengers were art patrons heading home to Atlanta on this charter flight. The tour group included many of Atlanta's cultural and civic leaders. Atlanta mayor Ivan Allen Jr. went to Orly to inspect the crash site where so many Atlantans perished.

During their visit to Paris, the Atlanta arts patrons had seen Whistler's Mother at the Louvre. In late 1962, the Louvre, as a gesture of good will to the people of Atlanta, sent Whistler's Mother to Atlanta to be exhibited at the Atlanta Art Association museum on Peachtree Street.<ref>[http://www.uni-leipzig.de/~kuge/zoellner/mona_lisa-jfk.htm, Frank Zollner, John F. Kennedy and Leonardo's Mona Lisa: Art as the Continuation of Politics]</ref>

The crash occurred during the civil rights movement in the United States. Civil rights leader Martin Luther King Jr. and entertainer and activist Harry Belafonte announced cancellation of a sit-in in downtown Atlanta (a protest of the city's racial segregation) as a conciliatory gesture to the grieving city. However, Nation of Islam leader Malcolm X, speaking in Los Angeles, expressed joy over the deaths of the all-white group from Atlanta, saying  These remarks led Los Angeles Mayor Sam Yorty to denounce him as a "fiend" and Dr. King to voice disagreement with his statement. Malcolm later remarked, "The Messenger should have done more." This incident was the first in which Malcolm X gained widespread national attention. Malcolm later explained what he meant: "When that plane crashed in France with a 130 white people on it and we learned that 120 of them were from the state of Georgia, the state where my own grandfather was a slave in, well to me it couldn't have been anything but an act of God, a blessing from God (...)"

Atlanta's Center Stage (a theatre now primarily used as a music venue) was built as a memorial to Helen Lee Cartledge, a victim of the plane crash. It was almost entirely funded by her mother Frania Lee, heiress to the Hunt Oil fortune. The theatre opened in 1966.

The Woodruff Arts Center, originally called the Memorial Arts Center and one of the United States' largest, was founded in 1968 in memory of those who died in the crash. The loss to the city was a catalyst for the arts in Atlanta, helped create this memorial to the victims, and led to the creation of the Atlanta Arts Alliance. The French government donated a Rodin sculpture, The Shade, to the High Museum of Art in memory of the victims of the crash.

Ann Uhry Abrams, the author of Explosion at Orly: The True Account of the Disaster that Transformed Atlanta, described the incident as "Atlanta's version of September 11 in that the impact on the city in 1962 was comparable to New York of September 11."

One of the victims of the flight was artist Douglas Davis Jr., known for his astonishing portraits of singer Edith Piaf that can be seen on album covers late in her career. Davis had a studio in Paris and he returned to Atlanta at the urging of his friends who were part of the Atlanta Arts patrons on board the flight. Douglas's father was Douglas Davis Sr., an accomplished air racer, who died after crashing his plane at the National Air Races in September 1934. His son was about the same age as his father when he died in the Air France 707 Boeing crash.

 In art and popular culture 
Andy Warhol painted his first "disaster painting", 129 Die in Jet!, based on the 4 June 1962 cover of New York Daily Mirror, the day after the crash. At that time, the death count was 129. The two known paintings are one in the Museum Ludwig in Cologne, Germany, and one in a private collection.

 Flight number 
Air France continues to use the flight number AF7 today (with AFR007 as the ICAO flight number and callsign). However, the flight number is used on the trip back to France, and the flight now only runs from New York City's John F. Kennedy International Airport to Paris's Charles de Gaulle Airport, the airline operates currently operates the Boeing 777 aircraft interchangeably on this trip. The airlines also used an Airbus A380 on the route until its retirement in June 2020. The forward trip is now Flight 6, terminating in New York.

 See also 

 Ameristar Charters Flight 9363, another instance of a rejected takeoff above V1 necessitated by a flight-control failure, albeit with a very different outcome
 Garuda Indonesia Flight 865

 References 

 External links 
The Day Atlanta Stood Still, 2001 Georgia Public TV documentary about the Orly Accident from the city of Atlanta's perspective.
The Day Atlanta Died , from About North Georgia
Orly Air Crash of 1962 , from the New Georgia Encyclopedia
1962: 130 die in Paris air crash, On This Day'', British Broadcasting Corporation (BBC)
 
Article on the crash at PilotFriend.com
 Official report by the enquiry board of French ministry in charge of transportation (Archive)

Aviation accidents and incidents in 1962
Aviation accidents and incidents in France
007
Airliner accidents and incidents involving runway overruns
Accidents and incidents involving the Boeing 707
1962 in France
History of Atlanta
June 1962 events in Europe
1962 disasters in France